The jewels of Anne of Denmark (1572–1619), wife of James VI and I and queen consort of Scotland and England, are known from accounts and inventories, and their depiction in portraits by artists including Paul van Somer. A few pieces survive. Some modern historians prefer the name "Anna" to "Anne", following the spelling of numerous examples of her signature.

Goldsmiths and jewellers

Jewels and the royal wedding

James VI and Anne of Denmark were married by proxy in August 1589 and in person when they met at Oslo. Lord Dingwall and the King's proxy, the Earl Marischal bought a jewel in Denmark, given to her at "the time of the contracting of the marriage". A diamond ring was involved in these ceremonies, described as "a great ring of gold enamelled set with five diamonds, hand in hand in the midst, called the espousall ring of Denmark". This ring, and a gold jewel with the crowned initials "J.A.R" picked out in diamonds, were earmarked as important Scottish jewels and brought to England by King James in 1603, in the keeping of his favourite, Sir George Home.

James' goldsmiths returned some royal pieces to him at Leith before he set out, jewels they held as pledges for loans. While he was in Denmark, James VI ordered his chancellor, John Maitland of Thirlestane to give jewels to Christian IV and his mother Sophie of Mecklenburg, to other royals at the wedding of Elisabeth of Denmark and Henry Julius, Duke of Brunswick-Lüneburg on 19 April 1590, and to the admiral Peder Munk. These gifts included four great table diamonds and two great rubies set in gold rings which the master of the royal wardrobe William Keith of Delny had brought to Denmark. 

When Anne of Denmark arrived in Scotland in May 1590 the city of Edinburgh organised a ceremony of Royal Entry. The queen was led to various sites in the town, and finally a rich jewel was lowered to her on a length of silk ribbon from the Netherbow Gate. This jewel, comprising a large emerald and diamond set in gold with pendant pearls, had been enlarged and remade by David Gilbert, a nephew of Michael Gilbert, from an older royal jewel which James VI had pledged to the town for a loan. The jewel was called the "A", probably referring to the crowned initial or cipher of "A" embroidered with gold thread on its purple velvet case. Soon after her coronation, the Earl of Worcester came as ambassador to Scotland from Elizabeth I. He brought Anne a richly wrought cloak set with jewels, a carkat of pearls with a tablet (a necklace), and a clock or watch.

Jacob Kroger
She brought a German jeweller Jacob Kroger with her to Scotland in May 1590. Kroger is known to have made fixing and buttons for the queen's costume, he described his work to an English border official John Carey in 1594. Kroger fled to England with some of the queen's jewels and a French stable worker called Guillaume Martin. He was returned to Edinburgh and executed. He may have been replaced by a French goldsmith called "Clei" of whom little is known.

Gift-giving and the baptism of Prince Henry
When Anne of Denmark was pregnant in December 1593, it was said that James VI gave Anne of Denmark the "greatest part of his jewels", possibly including the large table-cut diamond and cabochon ruby pendant known as the "Great H of Scotland" which had belonged to Mary, Queen of Scots. Her son, Prince Henry, was born at Stirling Castle on 19 February. On 8 April 1594, possibly marking her "churching", James VI gave Anne a gold garnishing or headdress made by Thomas Foulis with two rubies and 24 diamonds, and an opal ring.

In August 1594 her son Prince Henry was baptised at Stirling Castle. Joachim von Bassewitz was sent by Anne's grandfather, the Duke of Mecklenburg, with a gold chain or necklace for the queen, described as "very fair and antique". By antique it was meant the piece was made in modern classicising renaissance style. The necklace comprised rubies, chrysolites, and hyacinths set in roses. Bassewitz explained that it represented the combined English roses of York and Lancaster. It was suitable to wear on the front of gown "made after the French fashion, as the Queene now doth use".

Adam Crusius, the ambassador from the Duke of Brunswick brought his master's miniature portrait in a locket with his name set in diamonds and a scene of the death of Actaeon watched by Diana and her nymphs, his blood running from the "byting of the Doggs" picked out with polished rubies. A large pendant showing a scene of Diana and Actaeon is depicted worn on the sleeve in a 1589 portrait of Frances Brydges, Lady Chandos, by Hieronimo Custodis at Woburn Abbey.

New Year's Day gifts in Scotland
It was customary at the Scottish court to give gifts on New Years Day. In January 1596, James VI gave Anne of Denmark a pair of gold bracelets set with stones and pearls, a ruby ring, and a tablet and carcan set with diamonds and rubies. The gifts were supplied by the goldsmith and financier Thomas Foulis from the money James VI received as a subsidy from Elizabeth I and the custom duty of the Scottish gold mines.

Some jewels appear in costume accounts which were also administered by Foulis. Anne of Denmark owned clothes embroidered with pearls. In 1597 she ordered an elaborate gown embroidered with jet beads and buttons which proved too heavy to wear and her tailor was ordered to start again.

In later years the gifts appear in the regular royal treasurer's accounts. In January 1600, James gave her a great emerald set around with diamonds and another jewel set with 29 diamonds, and in January 1601 a gift provided by George Heriot cost £1,333 Scots.

George Heriot
From the early 1590s, George Heriot sold pieces to Anne of Denmark, and he was appointed goldsmith to the Queen on 17 July 1597. In August 1599 Heriot was paid £400 Sterling from the English annuity, a sum of money which Queen Elizabeth sent to Scotland, for jewels delivered to Anne of Denmark. He also provided items of embroidered costume and hats to the queen and her children. Several of her Scottish accounts and bills were checked and paid by William Schaw, Chamberlain of Dumfermline. Itemised jewels include a diamond feather with an emerald to wear in a hat, "ane fethir for ane hatt quherein thair is sett ane greit Imerod & ane uther Jewell conteining lxxiij dyamentis".

A surviving chain or necklace thought to have been made in Edinburgh for an Edinburgh merchant or his wife, resembles a design by Corvinianus Saur, an Augsburg jeweller who worked for Christian IV in 1596 and became his court jeweller in 1613. This piece may demonstrate close links in fashion between the royal courts of Scotland and Denmark, and the upper reaches of Edinburgh society. The links of the necklace, held in a private collection, have a central diamond surrounded by open gold work enamelled black with a simple crown.

Heriot and loans to the King and Queen
George Heriot made loans to Anne of Denmark, often secured on jewels. On 29 July 1601 he returned a feather or aigrette of rubies and diamonds set around an emerald which she had pledged for a loan. A request for a loan (not dated) written by Anne survives, "Gordg Heriott, I ernestlie dissyr youe present to send me tua hundrethe pundes withe all expidition becaus I man hest me away presentlie, Anna R."

A letter from James VI to Mark Kerr of Newbattle of June 1599 mentions that he had instructed John Preston of Fentonbarns to repay from tax receipts a sum of money advanced on the security of some of the queen's jewels to George Heriot. James VI required "the relief of our said dearest bedfellow's jewels engaged". Preston however, had reserved the money for the costs of an embassy to France. As the departure of his ambassador was delayed, James VI wanted Mark Kerr to ensure that Heriot was now paid. The King thought the transaction "touched us so nearly in honour". The letter is often quoted as an example of the queen's extravagance although it does not mention that this particular loan, which James was anxious to repay from his revenue, had been made to the queen.

A warrant from James VI dated July 1598 to the treasurer, Walter Stewart of Blantyre, requests 3,000 merks to be used to redeem jewels belonging to the queen pledged by his direction and command. The money was given to Andrew Stewart, Lord Ochiltree, who paid off a loan (possibly from Heriot) and redeemed two of the queen's jewels. James VI borrowed £6,720 from Heriot for which he pledged a jewel set with 74 diamonds, probably one of his own hat feathers. In 1603, Anne pledged a jewel with 73 diamonds, with a thin table diamond and two emeralds, to Heriot as security for a debt to him of £7,539-13s-4d Scots. After the Union of the Crowns, she continued to obtain jewels and loans from Heriot, occasionally ordering the chamberlain of her estates, Lord Carew,  to make repayments.

A gold cross, with seven diamonds and two rubies, pawned by Anne of Denmark to Heriot in May 1609, seems to be mentioned in several earlier inventories and accounts, and probably had belonged to Mary, Queen of Scots and her mother, Mary of Guise. In March 1613, to finance her progress to Bath, Anne pawned a "fair round jewel" with a diamond to Heriot for £1,200. The jewel was delivered to "Lady Rommeny", Rebecca Romney, the widow of a London merchant, by George Abercromby, a gentleman of the wardrobe.

Heriot and the court in England

Heriot's surviving bills for jewellery supplied to Anna of Denmark mostly date from 1605 to 1615, totalling around £40,000. One account was audited by Justinian Povey in February 1617. Her servants and chamberers Jean Drummond, Margaret Hartsyde and Dorothy Silking often dealt with him and made payments on her behalf. Hartsyde and Silking looked after the jewels that Anne wore, and may have dressed her. When she moved from place to place on progress, her jewels were kept secure by William Bell, clerk of the jewel coffers. She frequently wore a miniature portrait of Isabella Clara Eugenia and Heriot mended its locket case twice. She was less keen on full size portraits of the Archduchess and her husband and considered giving them away to a friend in Scotland.

Heriot made at least four jewels in the form of a diamond-set anchor for Anne. Surviving pieces made by Heriot for Anne include a gold miniature case set with her initials in diamonds, now held by the Fitzwilliam Museum, which the queen may have gifted to her lady-in-waiting Anne Livingstone, and a pair of earrings which include the enamelled face of an African man, in a private collection. The earrings were itemised by Heriot in 1609 as "two pendants made as more's heads and all sett with diamonds price £70." She also had "a pendant with a Moore's head". The case also includes a "CC" cipher, for Christian IV. Heriot supplied a jewel "with an A and two CC sett with diamonds".

In October 1620, King James gave one of Anne of Denmark's lockets to an ambassador from Savoy, the Marquis Villa. It was set with diamonds and contained portraits of the king and queen, the Elector Palatine, and his wife Elizabeth, and was worth about 2,000 crowns. Such jewellery, emphasising family relationships, was commissioned by Anne's family. A gold bracelet with crowned and enamelled "AC" ciphers surviving at Rosenborg Castle may have been Christian IV's gift to his wife Anna Cathrine.

Goldsmiths and gifts
Anne of Denmark also obtained jewels in the 1590s from another Edinburgh goldsmith Thomas Foulis, including a pair of bracelets set with gemstones and pearls, and a "tablet all diamonds" with a "carcan of diamonds and rubies". These were New Year's Day gifts from King James. Foulis and his partner Robert Jousie were involved in collecting the King's English subsidy in London, and bought a sapphire engraved with Queen Elizabeth's portrait for Anne of Denmark in 1598 made by Cornelius Dreghe, an associate of Abraham Harderet. Cornelius "Draggie" turned up in Edinburgh in 1601, attempting to set up a weaver's workshop to exploit generous subsidies for expert craftsmen, but the other weavers protested he was a lapidary, not a weaver.

Other goldsmiths who supplied Anne of Denmark in England include; Arnold Lulls, William Herrick, John Spilman, Nicholas Howker, Abraham der Kinderen, and Abraham Harderet who received an annual fee of £50 as the queen's jeweller. Spilman made a jewel with the "AR" cipher as the queen's gift to the Count of Aremburgh. Nicholas Howker made a chain which Anne of Denmark gave to the Spanish ambassador the Count of Villamediana as his parting gift in February 1606. It comprised gold snakes enamelled green, set with diamonds. Anne of Denmark gave another chain which had 86 elements including 22 green snakes set with small pearls and sparks of ruby to Anne Livingstone.

In 1603 the Earl of Rutland was sent to Denmark as ambassador to announce the successful Union of the Crowns. He bought four jewels in London for £75 as gifts for the Danish royal family, including a gold pelican set with an opal and wings studded with rubies which cost £9. Arnold Lulls made a jewel for Anne of Denmark intended as a gift for Margaret of Austria, Queen of Spain. Charles Howard, 1st Earl of Nottingham presented this jewel depicting the Habsburg emblems of a diamond double eagle and golden fleece to the Queen of Spain in Madrid in May 1605.

Anne gave jewels as gifts at christenings. She gave her lawyer Lawrence Hyde and his wife Barbara a diamond ring.

England and Queen Elizabeth's jewels 

At the Union of the Crowns in 1603, King James travelled south towards London leaving Anne of Denmark in Scotland. Scaramelli, a Venetian diplomat in London heard a rumour that Anne of Denmark had given away jewels, costume, and hangings to her ladies remaining in Scotland.

In April 1603 King James ordered that some of Elizabeth's jewels, and a hairdresser Blanche Swansted, should be sent to Berwick-upon-Tweed so that Anne of Denmark would appear like an English queen as she crossed the border. James reiterated this request, explaining these jewels were to be selected by Elizabeth's household attendants for Anne's "ordinary apparelling and ornament".

On 20 May a commission was appointed to inventory the remaining jewels in Mary Radcliffe's keeping and select the most suitable to be reserved as crown jewels. The remainder was returned to Radcliffe on 28 May. Over the coming year the remaining jewels were carefully examined and sorted. Lady Hatton petitioned to become keeper of the queen's jewels and to help dress her. Most of the jewels in Radcliffe's keeping were transferred to the new keeper, Lady Suffolk, or as "jewels of price" secured in the Tower of London. An inventory of some of Elizabeth's jewels made at this time included a brooch with a miniature of Henry VIII placed under a diamond-set crown and other old pieces like a "pater noster" or rosary of garnet, and a gold honeysuckle valued at £12 which may have a badge of Anne Boleyn.

Many of Queen Elizabeth's jewels were kept by Mary Radcliffe ready for her to wear. On 13 May 1603 King James had asked her to go through the jewels with Catherine Howard, Countess of Suffolk, presumably to make a selection for Anne of Denmark. A note in an inventory dated 19 May 1603 records that James selected a diamond-set gold crossbow on that day, perhaps to send to Anne of Denmark, who was later depicted wearing a crossbow jewel in her hair. The motif may be related to an emblem of Geffrey Whitney, who sees in the crossbow an allegory of the superiority of wit or ingenuity to brute strength. A crossbow jewel in Anne of Denmark's inventory, perhaps the same piece, had a red enamelled heart at the string.

In response to the king's orders, jewels were taken from the Tower of London on 8 June 1603 and delivered to Lady Suffolk, who had been a keeper of Elizabeth's jewels, to give to Anne of Denmark. Anne of Denmark arrived in York on 11 June. A gift of chain of pearls sent north by James to their daughter Princess Elizabeth arrived at York. Anne admired the pearls and swopped them for a set of ruby buttons (which may have once belonged to Mary, Queen of Scots). Years later, Elizabeth gave the ruby buttons to Frances Tyrrell. Lady Anne Clifford noted that Lady Suffolk, who brought jewels from the Tower of London, was with the queen at Dingley on 24 June. Lady Suffolk joined Anne of Denmark's household and became the keeper of her jewels. In time, responsibility for the queen's jewels passed to Bridget Marrow, a gentlewoman of the queen's privy chamber.

The queen normally travelled wearing a face mask to protect her complexion, but in June 1603 she rode towards London without a mask, in order to be seen by her new subjects, and Dudley Carleton wrote, as "for her favour she hath done it some wrong, for in all this journey she hath worn no mask". The French ambassador Christophe de Harlay, Count of Beaumont thought the queen was a Catholic and heard that she secretly wore a little cross at her breast with a relic of the True Cross.

The circlet and the English coronation 

One of first formal events involving Anne and her jewels was a reception of her ladies and aristocratic women at Windsor Castle on 2 July 1603, an event held in parallel with the installation of James' Knights of the Garter. The "great ladies" paid homage in turn, "most sumptuous in apparel, and exceeding rich and glorious in jewels". This was probably the day when Elizabeth Carey was sworn in as a lady of the privy chamber and "mistress of the sweet coffers".

The coronation of James and Anne was held on 25 July 1603 at Westminster Abbey, and Anne was provided with a jewelled circlet, made by the London goldsmiths John Spilman and William Herrick. The circlet included gemstones salvaged from Queen Elizabeth's jewels. The bill for making the circlet is held at the library of the University of Edinburgh:Item, made a rich circulet of gould for the Queene, set with dyamonds, rubyes, saphires, emeraldes and pearles, for the fashion thereof __ cl li [£150].

An Order of Service mentions (in Latin) that her hair would be loose about her shoulders, with the gem-set gold circlet on her head. The circlet was described in detail in March 1630; "A circlet of gold new made for our late dear mother Queen Anne, having in the midst eight fair diamonds of various sorts, eight fair rubies, eight emeralds, and eight sapphires, garnished with thirty two small diamonds, thirty two small rubies, and three-score and four [64] pearls fixed, and on each border thirty two small diamonds and thirty two small rubies".

Despite Spilman and Herrick's work on the circlet and the sacrifice of Elizabeth's jewels, it seems to have made little impact on the diplomatic community, as Scaramelli and Giovanni degli Effetti reported that she went to her coronation on Monday 25 July 1603 with a plain band of gold on her head. A list of jewels requested by William Segar from the Jewel House for the coronation mentions "a circle of gold for the Queen to wear when she goeth to her coronation", perhaps indicating that she did not wear the new circlet that King James had ordered. However, Benjamin von Buwinckhausen, a diplomat from the Duchy of Württemberg, described her seated in Westminster Abbey wearing a heavy coronet set with precious stones.

She was crowned with one of Elizabeth's "wearing crowns". The new circlet was added to the Crown Jewels in March 1606, but remained in Anne's keeping.

Jewels at court 
In January 1604 a jewel was featured in The Masque of Indian and China Knights at Hampton Court. It was sold to King James by Peter Vanlore, and was perhaps a diamond jewel with a pendant pearl costing £760. At this time, Vanlore sold to James another jewel comprising a large table ruby and two lozenge diamonds, for which he received in part exchange a parcel of Queen Elizabeth's jewels. The parcel included pieces that had been in the keeping of another of Elizabeth's ladies in waiting, the late Catherine Howard, Countess of Nottingham, a combined looking glass and clock with the figure of woman on a pillar wearing a table diamond on her forepart, and items taken from a ship regarded as a prize at sea. The parcel was valued at £5492-11s-2d and Vanlore received a further payment of £11,477 in February. Dudley Carleton heard the jewel in the masque cost James £40,000, more than twice this sum, and presumably an exaggeration. Later in January 1604 an inventory was made of other jewels from Elizabeth's collection still in the keeping of Earl of Nottingham including brooches fashioned like winding serpents set with emeralds. A selection was made of a number of Elizabeth's jewels listed in the Stowe inventory (British Library Stowe 557) on 30 January 1604, presumably for sale or exchange.

Auditor Gofton made a list of 29 jewels formerly in the Jewel House at the Tower of London which King James had given to Anne of Denmark on various occasions. He was rewarded with £20 in November 1614 for his work making inventories of jewels at the Tower over a decade.

In December 1607 King James retrieved some pieces from the Jewel House and sent them to the goldsmiths William Herrick and John Spilman for refurbishment. He gave four pieces to Anne of Denmark; a cup made of unicorn's horn with a gold cover (believed to guard against poison) set with diamonds and pearls, a gold jug or ewer, a salt with a branch set with sapphires and serpent's tongues (really fossilized shark teeth, also a safeguard against poisoning), and a crystal chess board with topaz and crystal pieces.

Anne of Denmark kept a chain or collar made up of three sorts of knots of diamonds, with a pendant like a gold key set with diamonds. This had been given to Elizabeth by the Earl of Leicester in 1584. Anne gave it to her daughter Elizabeth, and she wears it in a portrait by Meirevelt now at the museum of Châlons-sur-Saône. Elizabeth of Bohemia pawned the chain in the 1650s and her son Charles Louis redeemed it. Another collar was made up of letters in "Spanish work", spelling out a Latin motto Gemma preciosior intus - a greater jewel within. At the centre were the Greek letters alpha and omega. This had been Thomas Heneage's gift to Elizabeth in 1589. Anne had it lengthened by John Spilman in July 1610, adding the components of another Spanish work collar. Then in April 1611 Anne ordered Spilman and Nicasius Russell to dismantle parts of it for jewels to adorn table salts and a gold bowl. James may have given the remaining collar to the Duchess of Lennox as a New Year's Day gift in 1622.

Ambassadors and jewels
The Venetian ambassador Nicolò Molin was granted an English coat of arms featuring the wheel of a watermill, punning on his name. He gave Anne of Denmark a gold ring with an aquamarine with the motto "Una gota de aqui de molyne", meaning a drop of water from the mill.

Wiliam Herrick and Arnold Lulls were paid in October 1606 for pearls given by King James to Anne, and for "two pictures of gold set with stone" which she gave to the French ambassador Christophe de Harlay, Count of Beaumont and his wife Anne Rabot. Ambassadors had regular audiences with Anne of Denmark, and their wives also came to see the queen. John Finet described a visit of Isabelle Brûlart, the wife of French ambassador Gaspard Dauvet, Sieur des Marets, at Denmark House in December 1617, although no gifts are mentioned.

Anne and her ladies-in-waiting received gifts from ambassadors. In 1603, the French ambassadors, the Marquis de Rosny and Christophe de Harlay, Count of Beaumont, gave her a mirror of Venice crystal in a gold box set with diamonds, and a gold table clock with diamonds to Lucy Russell, Countess of Bedford, a gold box with the French king's portrait to Lady Rich and a pearl and diamond necklace to "Lady Rosmont". Rosny also gave a diamond ring to "Margaret Aisan, a favourite lady of the queen's bedchamber", this was Margaret Hartsyde, a Scottish servant who lacked the aristocratic status of the other women.

Juan Fernández de Velasco, Constable of Castile, commissioned jewels in Antwerp as gifts to distribute at the English court in 1604. Against the current custom he tried to buy on a sale-or-return basis and was flatly refused. He gave jewels to prominent figures in Anna's houseshold likely to promote the Catholic cause, Lady Anna Hay received a gold anchor studded with 39 diamonds, and Jean Drummond an aigrette studded with 75 diamonds, both pieces supplied by a Brussels jeweller Jean Guiset.

King James and Anne sent a variety of gifts to Brussels in 1605, including deer, dogs, horses and caparisons, and Anne sent the Infanta Isabella Clara Eugenia embroidered waistcoats and pillow-cases, which she politely declared were finer than any Spanish needlework. After the Gunpowder plot, the Queen of Spain sent an embassy to congratulate the royal family on their safe deliverance, bringing Anne a Spanish-style satin robe embellished with gilt leather, with 48 long gold tags or aglets (at 3 inches, longer than those used in England), with chains and necklaces of gold beads all filled with scented ambergris. Scent was a feature of Spanish diplomacy, Villamediana brought a perfumer in 1603. In January 1604 Marie de' Medici, Queen of France sent Anne of Denmark a cabinet inset with panels scented with musk and ambergris to make a "sweet savour". The drawers were full of flowers for setting in head attires and other jewels. A similar item was listed in 1619 at Denmark House, a "cabinet of pomander" containing a "curious suite of pomander" in a store room next to the little bedchamber.

In May 1613 Anne went to Bath to take the waters for her health. The ambassador of Savoy started to follow her bringing a gift of a crystal casket mounted with silver gilt, but gave up and returned to London. He had brought lions and other live beasts for King James.

Descriptions of the queen and her jewels

Ambassadors frequently described Anne of Denmark's magnificent appearance. The Venetian diplomats Piero Duodo and Nicolo Molin had an audience with Anne of Denmark at Wilton House in November 1603, she was seated under a canopy, covered with jewels and strings of pearls. The Constable of Castille saw Anne of Denmark at Whitehall Palace on 25 August 1604. She was sitting on a throne with a canopy or cloth of estate decorated with rubies, emeralds, and hyacinths watching dancing. On 28 August he had his formal audience with the queen who was attended by twenty beautiful Maids of Honour.

The Venetian ambassador Zorzi Giustinian wrote that the queen and her ladies' pearls and jewels were a highlight of The Masque of Beauty. Giustinian thought such an abundant and splendid display could not be rivalled by another royal court. Antonio Foscarini admired her pearls at the wedding of Princess Elizabeth in 1613, she wore "in her hair a number of pear-shaped pearls, the most beautiful in the world". She wore diamonds all over her white satin costume so that she appeared ablaze. The jewels were thought to be worth £400,000. 

In December 1617 Orazio Busino, the chaplain of Piero Contarini, described Anne of Denmark at Somerset House. She was seated under a canopy of gold brocade. Her costume was pink and gold, low cut at the front in an oval shape, and her farthingale was four feet wide. Her hair was dressed with diamonds and other jewels and extended in rays, or like the petals of a sunflower, with artificial hair.

Ben Jonson mentioned jewels worn by nine female performers on 14 January 1608 at the "Throne of Beauty" in his account of The Masque of Beauty, "the habit and dressing for the fashion was most curious, and so exceeding riches, that the throne whereon they sat seemed to be a mine of light, struck from their jewels and their garments". Anne wore a collar of diamonds and ciphers of "P" and "M" which had belonged to Mary I of England. Busino gave a description of the jewels and costume of aristocrats and ladies in waiting in the audience at the masque on 6 January 1617, Jonson's The Vision of Delight;every box was filled notably with most noble and richly arrayed ladies, in number some 600 and more according to the general estimate; the dresses being of such variety in cut and colour as to be indescribable; the most delicate plumes over their heads, springing from their foreheads or in their hands serving as fans; strings of jewels on their necks and bosoms and in their girdles and apparel in such quantity that they looked like so many queens, so that at the beginning, with but little light, such as that of the dawn or of the evening twilight, the splendour of their diamonds and other jewels was so brilliant that they looked like so many stars ... The dress peculiar to these ladies is very handsome ... behind it hangs wellnigh from the neck down to the ground, with long, close sleeves and waist ... The farthingale also plays its part. The plump and buxom display their bosoms very liberally, and those who are lean go muffled up to the throat. All wear men's shoes or at least very low slippers. They consider the mask as indispensable for their face as bread at table, but they lay it aside willingly at these public entertainments".

The audience on that night included Lady Anne Clifford, Lady Ruthin, the Countess of Pembroke, the Countess of Arundel, Pocahontas and Tomocomo. Costume worn at court was expensive, in December 1617 Anne Clifford gave Anne of Denmark a satin skirt with £100 worth of embroidery.

In portraits, Anne of Denmark and her contemporaries are seen to wear jewels suspended from the ear by shoelaces, or black cords. As a male fashion, this use of laces was mocked by the poet Samuel Rowlands in 1609. Rowlands suggests that a "lowly minded youth" would crave the "shoe-string" of a courtesan to wear as a favour for his ear.

Decorative arts: table fountains, salts, and clocks

The Welsh-born goldsmith John Williams supplied a "fountain of silver gilt, well chased, containing one basin with two tops, one of them being three satyres or wild men, the other a woman with a sail or flag". The fountain had three taps or cocks decorated with mermaids. It was used at Somerset House, known in her time as "Denmark House". The wild men were heraldic supporters of the Danish royal arms. A table fountain formerly thought to have belonged to Anne's sister-in-law Anna Kathrine (1575-1612), wife of Christian IV, but now known to date from 1648, survives at Rosenborg Castle. It features the story of Actaeon and Diana and was designed to dispense distilled and perfumed waters.

At Denmark House, she had a green enamelled palm tree with a crown and a Latin epigram in gilt letters on the queen's fruitfulness as matriarch of the Stuart succession, composed by her secretary, the poet William Fowler, and based on his anagram of her name; "Anna Brittanorum Regina" - "In anna regnantium arbor". The anagram was printed in Henry Peacham's Minerva Brittana (London, 1612), attributed to Fowler, with an image of an olive tree bearing the initials of her three children, Henry, Charles, and Elizabeth. The verse on the tree was:Perpetuo vernans arbor regnantium in Anna,Fert fructum et frondes, germine laeta vivo.Anna's ever flourishing tree,Bearing fruit and leaves, her happy life continues. William Fowler's own translation was:Freshe budding blooming trie,from ANNA faire which springs,Growe on blist birth with leaves and fruit,from branche to branche in kings.

Sir Robert Cecil had referred to Anne of Denmark's children as "your royall branches" in May 1603. The figurative image of Anne of Denmark as a fruitful vine, an olive tree with four branches, was used in a speech made in Parliament after the Gunpowder Plot by Thomas Egerton, 1st Viscount Brackley as Lord Chancellor. The palm tree was admired and described by John Ernest I, Duke of Saxe-Weimar who visited London in 1613. The object seems to have been a salt combined with a clock, described in 1620 with other items of the queen's tableware scheduled for sale as; " a salt of gold in pieces, having a clock within crystal, the foot of same being gold triangle wise, the cover thereof being a castle, and out of the same castle a green tree, the flowers being diamonds and rubies in roses, the same clock salt and crystal garnished with gold, diamonds, and rubies, wanting a dial in the same clock".

Another unusual clock at Denmark House was made in the form of a tortoise of silver-gilt, with 16 flat pearls and 11 smaller pearls forming the shell, with emeralds on the head, neck, and tail, and a clock mounted in its body. When Anne of Denmark was pregnant with her daughter Mary she moved in January 1605 for her confinement or lying-in to special lodgings at Greenwich Palace. A magnificent cupboard of gilt plate was provided for her Privy Chamber. She kept one piece for later use, a "jug of crystal garnished with silver gilt, with a phoenix in the top in a crown, the handle like a horse's head". Following the birth of Princess Mary, King James gave her a diamond jewel and two dozen buttons worth £1550, provided by Arnold Lulls and Philip Jacobson. In February 1612 Christian IV sent her a mirror framed in gold, sprinkled with diamonds, pearls and jewels.

The inventory of 1606

The inventory is held by the National Library of Scotland and includes over 400 items, including pieces inherited from Queen Elizabeth, and gifts from King James and Christian IV. It is not clear if any of the jewels had belonged to Mary, Queen of Scots. The inventory lists the jewels as they were kept, in numbered chests with individual index letters. Contemporary notes added to the inventory record that many pieces were broken up to provide gems to set in tableware. Such pieces were often given to ambassadors as gifts. A necklace of knots of pearls, some set with rubies, was given to the queen's daughter Princess Mary. After the child's death it was given to her nurse.

A "feather" jewel with seven spriggs was deprecated because its stones were topazes set in imitation of diamonds and its pearls, though "fair and round", were Scottish. A note in the inventory shows that when it was dismantled for its gold the topazes were kept back to show the queen. Diamonds were taken from three bracelets when Anne wanted them for new aglet tags. She changed her mind and the diamonds were kept (for a time) in a chest with other loose stones and pearls.

An "attire" for the queen's hair was described in detail; "An Attire for the heade made of wire with hair colour silk, having eleven spiggs, upon every sprigg a great Pearl fastened with silver wire, the middle pearl being the greatest, the gold not going through it, in weight __ 2oz 3dwt 21grs." A portrait medal struck in gold and silver, thought to commemorate her English coronation, represents her jewelled hairstyle in England. Some attires were supplied by tire-makers, shortly before leaving Scotland Anne appointed John Taylor as her tire-maker. Her young companion, Anne Livingstone, recorded the purchase of an attire in similar fashion for herself in 1604,  "ane wyer to my haed with nyne pykis" (9 peaks), with a "perewyk of hair to cover the wyr". Livingstone was a member of the household of Princess Elizabeth, whose portraits show these wire framed attires. Anne of Denmark's inventory records gifts of jewels to Livingstone when she left the court and returned to Scotland to marry Sir Alexander Seton of Foulstruther, who was made Earl of Eglinton.

A portrait of Anne of Denmark by Paul van Somer in the National Portrait Gallery, London shows a central jewel in the queen's hair possibly attached to the red ribbon-covered wire of the attire, or more likely pinned in the hair with a bodkin. It comprises a large table-cut diamond with a tuft of feathers, with a pear pearl and a ruby drop beneath. This may be the jewel called the "Portugal diamond" or the "Mirror of France". The "Mirror of Portugal" was acquired by Queen Elizabeth from António, Prior of Crato and re-used by Anne of Denmark with the "Cobham pearl". King James wore the Portugal diamond on his hat on 27 May 1603. The ruby may be the one listed in Elizabeth's 1587 inventory, "to be worne on the forehead".

Anne's 1606 inventory includes, "A faire and great table Diamond being the Diamond of Portingale, set in a plaine thinne Collet of gold, with a very small carnation silk Lace [and] pearl pendant". The inventory notes that John Spilman added a gold bodkin shank or stalk. The Portugal diamond and the Cobham pearl were recorded later in the seventeenth century by drawings made by Thomas Cletcher, a jeweller of The Hague. Cletcher drew jewels belonging to Henrietta Maria during her exile. His album is held by the Museum Boijmans Van Beuningen.

Jewels with an Annunciation scene and Diana with three nymphs and Actaeon, probably elements from the lockets given to Anne at baptism of Prince Henry in 1594, were listed together in 1606. The Annunciation was given to Anne Livingstone. Diana and Actaeon was scrapped by Nicasius Russell to make a basin and ewer in 1609.

A jewel in the inventory, dismantled for its diamonds and gold in 1610, depicted a woman on the back of a monster "half a man and half a dragons taile". It was suspended by three chains from a gold knop. The piece may have been inspired by images such as Albrecht Dürer's enigmatic sea monster.

A ruby from the Mirror of Great Britain
King James gave Anne of Denmark the ruby from the jewel known as the 'Mirror of Great Britain' as a New Year's Day gift in January 1608 set in an aigrette with twenty eight small diamonds. The ruby may have been replaced by a diamond to make the 'Mirror of Great Britain' into a symmetric jewel, like the hat badge of King James later drawn by Thomas Cletcher. 
Contarini noted King James wearing a hat badge with 'five diamonds of extraordinary size' at dinner in February 1610, perhaps the 'Mirror of Great Britain' in this alternative configuration. The Mirror's pendant diamond was the famous Sancy.

Jewels, drawings, and Arthur Bodren
A note in the inventory mentions that Anne of Denmark came to the Jewel House herself on 21 July 1610 to select jewels. A letter dated 23 August 1618 gives an insight into the commissioning of jewels and the re-use of old pieces. It was sent by an unknown courtier to Arthur Bodren, a French servant and page of the bedchamber to Anne of Denmark who kept accounts. He gave money to Inigo Jones for the queen's building works at Greenwich and Oatlands. George Heriot delivered "little things" for the queen to "Arthur Bodrane" of the bedchamber.

The writer had received a message and a "pattern", a drawing, made by Mr Halle for a new jewel. He went to the royal Jewel House to find suitable jewels and rubies to use in the new piece. An old diamond bracelet had the right size stones, but Nicasius Russell had already taken any suitable rubies to set in gold plate for the table. He found a "border", with larger diamonds to send to the queen for approval. Halle told him that would please the queen, who "did mislike of the greater diamonds in his pattern in regard they were too little".

A note written in the 1606 inventory next to an entry for a diamond "girdle or border" identifies it as the piece selected for Bodren to send to Anne of Denmark at Hampton Court in 1618. Arthur Bodren went on to serve Henrietta Maria. He died in 1632 and left legacies to several members of her household including 20 shillings each to Jeffrey Hudson and Little Sara. Contemporary drawings of jewels by a London goldsmith Arnold Lulls survive in the Victoria and Albert Museum.

Anne of Denmark pawned some of her most valuable diamonds in March 1615 for £3,000. The goldsmith John Spilman made record drawings of the cut of eleven stones and indicated the settings of two. He noted them as eight table diamonds set in gold enamelled black, one diamond resembling a glass window quarry, and two lozenge diamonds cut in facets.

Disposal of a royal collection
In her lifetime, Anne give jewels to her friends and supporters. Jewels and lockets that were gifts from Anne of Denmark are mentioned in wills and inventories. In 1640 the Laird of Glenorchy at Balloch Castle had a "round jewell of gold sett with precious stanes conteining twentie nyne diamonds and four great rubbies, quhilk [which] Queene Anna of worthie memorie Queene of Great Britane France and Irland gave to umquhill [the late] Sir Duncane Campbell of Glenurquhy. Item ane gold ring sett with ane great diamond schapine [shaped] lyke a heart and four uther small diamonds, quhilk the said Queene Anna of worthie memorie gave to the said Sir Duncane". Anne of Denmark sent the "round jewel" to the Laird of Glenorchy in 1607 to wear in his hat.

She did not leave a will bequeathing her jewels. In the years before her death, Prince Charles asked her to make her will, leaving her jewels to him, which did not please King James at all. The lawyer Edward Coke made a note at Denmark House on 19 January 1619 that she wished her "rich stuff, jewels, and plate" to be annexed to the crown, added to the Crown Jewels.

An inventory of her jewels and plate was made after her death by Sir Lionel Cranfield on 19 April 1619. Anne had played the virginals, and the case of one instrument at Denmark House was made of green velvet embroidered with pearls. Soon after the inventory was made, the queen's French page Piero Hugon and the "Dutch maid Anna" were taken to the Tower of London accused of stealing jewels. George Heriot produced "models" or drawings of missing jewels which he had supplied to the queen, said to be worth £63,000. The goldsmith and financier Peter Vanlore advanced £18,000 on some of the remaining jewels to pay the costs of the king's summer progress.

King James directed his officers to sell some minor items from Anne's collection and wardrobe in July 1619, including fabrics and gowns that had belonged to former queens. Some "jewels, precious stones, plate, and ornaments" had already been sold. The next sales were to include "loose and ragged pearls, some parcels of silver plate, together with broken and ends of silver, linen which hath been much worn, cabinets, remnants of stuff of all sorts, old robes and garments of former queens of this realm". Anne's collection also included some of the clothes of Henry VIII.

King James asked Cranfield to bring a selection of jewels to him from the Tower of London in March 1623, including the queen's fine pendant diamonds, and jewels "fittest for the wearing of women". In 1623 these and others jewels were sent to Spain during the Spanish Match, some with Francis Stewart including the "Portugal diamond". An inventory was made in May 1625 of a chest of her remaining jewels, including the circlet, the crown used at her Scottish coronation in 1590, and a head attire with nine great round pearls. Jewels including the circlet were acquired and sold in 1630 by James Maxwell, 1st Earl of Dirletoun. The crown of the Scottish queens, possibly made for Mary of Guise by John Mosman in 1540 was in the Tower of London in 1649, described as a "small crown found in an iron chest, formerly in the Lord Cottington's charge".

Charles I gave Princess Mary a crystal casting bottle set with rubies and diamonds with a chain featuring his mother's "AR" cipher at her marriage to the Prince of Orange on 30 April 1641.

Jewel thieves
Servants of Anne of Denmark were accused and convicted of stealing her jewels on several occasions, Jacob Kroger in 1594, Margaret Hartsyde in 1608, Piero Hugon and "Dutch maid Anna" in 1619. Dorothy Silken was alleged to have taken gilt plate. "Dutch maid Anna" was probably the favourite domestic servant "Mistress Anna" or Anna Kaas, who was said to have received the queen's valuable linen at her death, despite being "so mean a gentlewoman". "Danish Anna" was with the queen at Hampton Court at her deathbed.

A chest of the queen's jewels discovered at Denmark House in 1621 is mentioned in the royal jewel inventories, and 37 diamonds from these "secret jewels" were used to decorate a miniature of King James sent to Elizabeth of Bohemia. This find is sometimes connected with the theft by Piero Hugon and Danish Anna.

References

External links
 'Anna of Denmark, and The Eglinton Jewel', National Galleries of Scotland
 'Anna of Denmasrk and pearls', National Galleries of Scotland
 Depicting Anna of Denmark: Images of Anna of Denmark: 1574-1603, Sara Ayres and Joseph Massey
 Depicting Anna of Denmark: Images of Anna of Denmark, The English and Irish Accession, Sara Ayres and Joseph B.R. Massey
 Gold medal commemorating the English coronation of Queen Anne, 1603, Royal Museums Greenwich
 Silver medal commemorating the English coronation of Queen Anne, British Museum
 Portrait of Anna of Denmark, 1595, circle of Adrian Vanson, National Galleries of Scotland
 Portrait of Anna of Denmark, circa 1605 with diamond and cabochon ruby pendant, after John de Critz, Sotheby's, 23 September 2020 lot 97
 Portrait of Anna of Denmark, circa 1605 with diamond and cabochon ruby pendant, after John de Critz, Government Art Collection
 Portrait of Anna of Denmark, circa 1605 with diamond and cabochon ruby pendant, after John de Critz, Colchester and Ipswich Museums Service
 Portrait of Anna of Denmark, after John de Critz, Blickling Hall, National Trust
 Portrait of Anna of Denmark, John de Critz, National Portrait Gallery, London
 Portrait of Anna of Denmark, with a diamond aigrette and pear pearl tire, circle of John de Critz, St John's College Cambridge
 Portrait of Anna of Denmark, dated 1614, attributed to Marcus Gheeraerts the younger, Royal Collection, Holyrood Palace
 Portrait of Anna of Denmark, Paul van Somer, Royal Collection
 Portrait of Anna of Denmark, after John de Critz, National Galleries Scotland
 Miniature of Anna of Denmark, Isaac Oliver, National Portrait Gallery, London
 Portrait of Anne of Denmark, anonymous oil on panel, National Galleries Scotland
 Elizabeth Cary, 1st Viscountess Falkland, Paul Van Somer, MFAH

Anne of Denmark
Jewellery
16th century in Scotland
17th century in England
17th-century fashion
Early Modern Scotland
Scottish monarchy
British royal attire
Scottish royal court
Scottish jewellery
Material culture of royal courts